Neil Broad and David Macpherson were the defending champions, but both players chose to compete at Memphis with different partners.

Mark Kratzmann and Wally Masur won the title by defeating Tom Nijssen and Cyril Suk 4–6, 6–3, 6–4 in the final.

Seeds

Draw

Draw

References

External links
 Official results archive (ATP)
 Official results archive (ITF)

Milan Indoor - Doubles, 1993
Milan